Peter Slaghuis (21 August 1961 – 5 September 1991) was a Dutch DJ, record producer and remixer, whose work was mostly released under the name Hithouse (a literal translation of his last name — slag, a hit, a beat; and huis, house).

Biography
Slaghuis was born in Rijswijk, Netherlands. Not much is known about his personal life, but he was a figure in the European dance music scene in the 1980s, producing popular remixes of various hits (most notably the "Long Vocal Dutch Mix" of "I Can't Wait" by Nu Shooz). Slaghuis stated "I hated that song so much... I just had to put a hook over it." With the arrival of house music in Europe, Slaghuis took up the pseudonym Hithouse and began using his sampling techniques in this field.

His best known work, "Jack to the Sound of the Underground", reached No. 14 on the UK Singles Chart in 1988 and number 57 in Australia.

His next few works did not attain the same level of success, though "Jack to the Sound of the Underground" remained in public consciousness in the UK when used as the theme for both the radio and television versions of the BBC comedy show The Mary Whitehouse Experience.

He was also known for being part of the Euro disco music project VideoKids, which released several hit songs such as "Woodpeckers from Space" and "Do the Rap", in 1985, featuring Slaghuis in the video alongside Bianca and Tico, the other member and the goofy cartoon mascot. The band only lasted up until his death. By the time 1988 came, the whole project was virtually gone, and there has not been any sales on their music since that period.

Slaghuis also delivered remixes to the Disco Mix Club which published them on their monthly CDs and compilation CDs. One of his most famous mixes was Madonna's "La Isla Bonita". He also remixed Petula Clark's "Downtown" as "Downtown '88" which hit the British top 10 in December 1988.

He died in 1991 in a head-on car accident involving a tractor trailer truck while he was driving home from a concert.

References

External links
 Memorial website operated by his mother (Dutch / English). This seems no longer active.
 Memorial website operated by his mother (Dutch / English). The last sep 11 2019 archived version of the above site on archive.org.
 Biography at DISCOGS.com (English)

1961 births
1991 deaths
Dutch dance musicians
Dutch DJs
Dutch record producers
People from Rijswijk
Remixers
Road incident deaths in the Netherlands